The Reeths-Puffer School District is a public school district located in Muskegon, Michigan. Reeths-Puffer currently has an early education center, formally McMillan Elementary, 3 elementary schools, 1 intermediate school, 1 middle school, and 1 high school.

History

The name of the district is taken from two separate school districts that later merged; named for Mr. Hiram Puffer, who founded the first school in the area in the 1870s, and Mr. Charles Reeths. The first school building that was part of what would eventually become the Puffer School district was built in the 1870s by Hiram Puffer who then taught at the school. In 1925 this original structure was replaced by a brick building. Two additional schools, the Pillon and Baxter School buildings, were built in the early 1900s. In 1903 children began being taught in a new building that was named the Reeths School in honor of Charles Reeths who served on the school board and had 11 children who attended the district. The Reeths District continued to expand and on November 29, 1946 the Reeths and Puffer districts were merged. In the fall of 1958, Reeths-Puffer Schools opened its doors to its first full year as a kindergarten through 12th grade school, with an enrollment of 1,123.

Schools
The district contains the following schools:

Reeths-Puffer High School - 1545 North Roberts Rd, Muskegon, MI 49445
Reeths-Puffer Middle School - 1911 W. Giles Rd, Muskegon, MI 49445
Reeths-Puffer Intermediate School - 1500 N. Getty Street, Muskegon, MI 49445
Reeths-Puffer Elementary - 404 N. Getty Street, Muskegon, MI 49445
Twin Lake Elementary School - 3175 Fifth Street, Twin Lake, MI 49457
Central Elementary School - 1807 West Giles Rd, Muskegon, MI 49445
McMillan Early Childhood Center - 1822 Hyde Park Rd, Muskegon, MI

Notable alumni

Scott Goudie, actor and author
Mark Grimmette, Olympic and World Championship luger
Mark Hughes, professional basketball player, coach and administrator
Rocky Marquette, actor
Nate McCrary, NFL running back for the Baltimore Ravens
Seth Privacky, mass murderer
Steven Rinella - hunter/outdoorsman, and television personality, most notably for Meat Eater series on Netflix.
Matt Timme, former basketball player at SMU, father of current Gonzaga basketball player Drew Timme
John Williams, former NFL running back

References

External links
 

Education in Muskegon County, Michigan
School districts in Michigan
1958 establishments in Michigan
School districts established in 1958